The San Germán-Cabo Rojo Metropolitan Statistical Area is a United States Census Bureau defined Metropolitan Statistical Area (MSA) in southwestern Puerto Rico. A July 1, 2009 Census Bureau estimate placed the population at 148,559, a 9.06% increase over the 2000 census figure of 136,212.

San Germán-Cabo Rojo is the fourth largest metropolitan area (by population) in Puerto Rico and is the second fastest growing MSA, after Aguadilla–Isabela–San Sebastián,  in the Commonwealth.

Municipalities
A total of four municipalities (Spanish: municipios) are included as part of the San Germán-Cabo Rojo Metropolitan Statistical Area.

Cabo Rojo (Principal city) Pop: 47,158
San Germán (Principal city) Pop: 31,879
Lajas Pop: 23,334
Sabana Grande Pop: 22,729

Combined Statistical Area
The San Germán-Cabo Rojo Metropolitan Statistical Area is a component of the Mayagüez–San Germán–Cabo Rojo Combined Statistical Area.

See also
Puerto Rico census statistical areas

References